Opekance (dialectically bobáľky, pupáky, pupáčiky or pupáčky), in Slovak, are small balls of yeast dough baked in a baking dish so that they are gently pressed together. In singular it is opekanec (dialectically bobáľka, pupák, pupáčik or pupáčka).

Christmas opekance 
In Slovakia, they are usually served as a fasting food during Christmas Day. Traditionally, they are poured with hot milk and sprinkled with ground nuts, poppy seeds, quark or other sprinkles mixed with sugar. Sliced rolls can also be used as a substitute for leavened opekance.

See also 
 Makówki

References

External links 
 Kultúra slova, 1971, 5 - p. 173

Desserts
Christmas food
Slovak cuisine